Harald Bjarne Slettebø (1 April 1922 – 27 May 2018) was a Norwegian school worker and politician (Fremskrittspartiet).

Slettebø received his cand.real. from the University of Oslo in 1946. He worked as a teacher in Stavanger and Haugesund, and in 1959 he became rector of Stord gymnas, a position he held until 1989. 

In 1973, Slettebø was elected to the Stortinget for Anders Langes Parti in Hordaland. He sat for one term, and was a member of the Justice committee. In 1976–77, he was also parliamentary leader, after the party changed its name to Fremskrittspartiet.

He later sat on Stord city council from 1979 to 1983 and on Hordaland county council and fylkesutvalg from 1983 to 1987.

References

1922 births
2018 deaths
People from Egersund
Members of the Storting
Progress Party (Norway) politicians
20th-century Norwegian politicians